The eighth season of Two and a Half Men premiered on September 20, 2010, and finished on February 14, 2011, and was the last season with Charlie Sheen as its main star. With 16 episodes aired, it was the shortest season of the series up to that time, although season 12 would later have the same number of half-hour programs. 

As of December 22, 2010, Two and a Half Men is ranked at number 10 on the 10 most watched TV programs of 2010.

Cast

Main 
 Charlie Sheen as Charlie Harper
 Jon Cryer as Alan Harper
 Angus T. Jones as Jake Harper
 Marin Hinkle as Judith Harper-Melnick
 Conchata Ferrell as Berta
 Holland Taylor as Evelyn Harper

Recurring 
 Courtney Thorne-Smith as Lyndsey MacElroy
 Graham Patrick Martin as Eldridge MacElroy
 Ryan Stiles as Herb Melnick
 Melanie Lynskey as Rose
 Kelly Stables as Melissa
 Jenny McCarthy as Courtney

Guest
 Judd Nelson as Chris MacElroy
 J.D. Walsh as Gordon
 Steve Hytner as Dr. Schenkman
 Erinn Hayes as Gretchen
 Liz Vassey as Michelle
 Martin Mull as Russell
 Nadia Bjorlin as Jill
 Macey Cruthird as Megan
 Tonita Castro as Esmeralda
 Carl Reiner as Marty Pepper
 Jane Lynch as Dr. Linda Freeman
 Dakin Matthews as Father Shaunassey

Production
Many reports of Sheen partying in Las Vegas, going on alcoholic binges, and dating pornstars had been over the Internet from the beginning of January 2011 and CBS had expressed its concern. Early in the morning of January 27, Sheen was rushed to hospital suffering from severe abdominal pains after holding a party at his house in which he allegedly smoked crack cocaine. After being released from the hospital, Sheen checked himself into rehab, causing the show to be put on hiatus, with production scheduled to resume on February 28. The season was originally ordered for 24 episodes, but due to Sheen entering rehab, the episode count was cut to 20. On February 24, 2011, it was announced that the show would shut down production for the rest of the season and cancel the remaining four episodes, due to Sheen making offensive comments about Chuck Lorre, the creator and lead writer of Two and a Half Men, on the February 24 edition of a radio broadcast hosted by Alex Jones. On March 7, 2011, Sheen was fired from the show. After much speculation over whether Sheen would return to the series after all, Lorre announced in April 2011 that he had new plans to reboot Two and a Half Men with Jon Cryer in a lead role alongside a new character. Ashton Kutcher was later hired to portray the new character, Walden Schmidt.

Episodes

Reception
Critical reception to season 8 was mixed. On the review aggregator, Rotten Tomatoes, the season holds an approval rating of 63%.

Ratings

US Nielsen ratings

Canadian ratings

Australian ratings

References

General references

External links 
 

Season 8
2010 American television seasons
2011 American television seasons

sv:Lista över avsnitt av 2 1/2 män#Säsong 8